Brett Wilkie is an Australian international lawn bowler.

Bowls career
Wilkie came to prominence after winning the Australian national championship and qualifying for the 2009 World Singles Champion of Champions event, where he won the gold medal defeating Wayne Hogg of Scotland in the final.

He was selected to play for Australia during the 2010 Commonwealth Games in Delhi where he won a triples silver medal. Wilkie then won the gold medal in the fours with Aron Sherriff, Mark Casey and Wayne Ruediger during the 2012 World Outdoor Bowls Championship in Adelaide and a silver medal in the triples.

He competed in the men's fours at the 2014 Commonwealth Games where he won a bronze medal.

He won two silver medals at the 2011 Asia Pacific Bowls Championships in Adelaide.

He won a gold medal with bowls pairs partner Aaron Wilson in the pairs at the 2016 World Outdoor Bowls Championship and won a silver medal in the fours.

He was selected as part of the Australian team for the 2018 Commonwealth Games on the Gold Coast in Queensland where he claimed a silver medal in the Fours with Aron Sherriff, Barrie Lester, and Nathan Rice.

References

1974 births
Living people
Bowls players at the 2010 Commonwealth Games
Bowls players at the 2014 Commonwealth Games
Bowls players at the 2018 Commonwealth Games
Commonwealth Games medallists in lawn bowls
Commonwealth Games bronze medallists for Australia
Commonwealth Games silver medallists for Australia
Australian male bowls players
Bowls World Champions
Sportspeople from Ballarat
Medallists at the 2010 Commonwealth Games
Medallists at the 2014 Commonwealth Games
Medallists at the 2018 Commonwealth Games